Tomas Bertelman (born 1945 in Lund), is a Swedish diplomat and the former Ambassador of Sweden to Russia, presenting his credentials to Russian President Dmitry Medvedev on 16 January 2009. He has previously also been ambassador in Madrid, Riga and Warsaw as well as Consul General in the then Leningrad (St Petersburg). Mr Bertelman has also been Secretary of the Parliamentary Foreign Affairs Committee.

In October 2012, TeliaSonera assigned Bertelman to act as a strategic advisor in matters concerning the company's operations in Central Asia. 

Bertelman is currently fluent in Swedish, English, Spanish, French,
Russian, Polish and German.

References

1945 births
Living people
Consuls-general of Sweden
Ambassadors of Sweden to Russia
Ambassadors of Sweden to Spain
Ambassadors of Sweden to Latvia
Ambassadors of Sweden to Poland
Commanders of the Order of Merit of the Republic of Poland